Clash of the Titans is a 1981 fantasy adventure film directed by Desmond Davis and written by Beverley Cross, loosely based on the Greek myth of Perseus. Starring Harry Hamlin, Judi Bowker, Burgess Meredith, Maggie Smith and Laurence Olivier, the film features the final work of stop-motion visual effects artist Ray Harryhausen.

Co-produced between the United Kingdom and United States, it was theatrically released on June 12, 1981 and grossed $41 million at the North American box office, which made it the eleventh highest grossing film of the year. A novelization by Alan Dean Foster was also published in 1981. A 3D remake of the same name was released by Warner Bros. on April 2, 2010.

Plot 

King Acrisius of Argos imprisons his daughter Danaë, trying to prevent a prophecy that her child will bring about his demise. When the god Zeus impregnates Danaë, Acrisius banishes her and her newborn son Perseus to sea in a wooden chest. In retribution, Zeus kills Acrisius and orders Poseidon to release the last of the Titans, a gigantic sea monster called the Kraken, to destroy Argos. Danaë and Perseus safely float to the island of Seriphos, where Perseus grows to adulthood.

Calibos, the spoiled son of the sea goddess Thetis, is betrothed to Princess Andromeda, daughter of Queen Cassiopeia of Joppa; but for committing several atrocities against Zeus, including destroying Zeus' sacred flying horses (except for Pegasus), Calibos is transformed into a deformed, satyr-like creature.

In revenge, Thetis transports an adult Perseus to an abandoned amphitheater in Joppa, where he befriends a soldier, Thallo, and an elderly poet named Ammon. Perseus learns that Andromeda is under a curse and cannot marry unless her suitor successfully answers a riddle concocted by Calibos. Zeus sends Perseus a god-crafted helmet from Athena which makes its wearer invisible, a magical sword from Aphrodite, and a shield from Hera. After capturing Pegasus, Perseus follows Calibos's giant vulture carrying off Andromeda's spirit during her sleep to learn the next riddle. Perseus is discovered and nearly killed by Calibos. In the ensuing fight, Calibos loses his left hand, and Perseus loses his helmet.

The next morning, Perseus presents himself as a suitor and correctly answers the riddle — that answer being the ring given to Calibos by his mother which is still attached to the amputated hand — winning Andromeda's hand in marriage. Finding that Thetis cannot act against Perseus, Calibos instead demands that she take vengeance on Joppa. At the wedding in Thetis' temple, Cassiopeia declares that Andromeda's beauty is greater than Thetis'; an earthquake starts, causing the head of the statue of Thetis to break off and crash to the floor.

Thetis, using the statue's head to speak through, declares that Cassiopeia will pay for her boasting and for the injury inflicted on Calibos and demands Andromeda be sacrificed to the Kraken on pain of Joppa's destruction. Perseus seeks a way to defeat the Kraken. However, Pegasus is captured by Calibos and his men. Zeus commands Athena to give Perseus her owl Bubo, but she refuses. Instead, she orders Hephaestus to build a mechanical replica that leads Perseus, Andromeda, Ammon, Thallo and some soldiers to the Stygian Witches. By taking their magic eye, Perseus forces them to reveal that the only way to defeat the Kraken is by using the head of the gorgon Medusa, whose gaze can turn any living thing into stone. Medusa lives on an island in the River Styx at the edge of the Underworld. The next day, the group continues on their journey while Andromeda and Ammon return to Joppa.

On the Gorgon's island, the three soldiers travelling with Perseus are killed. Perseus fights and kills Medusa's guardian, a two-headed dog named Dioskilos. At the Gorgon's lair, Perseus uses the reflective underside of his shield to deceive Medusa, decapitate her, and collect her head. However, the shield is dissolved by her caustic blood. As Perseus and his party set to return, Calibos enters their camp and punctures the cloak carrying Medusa's head, causing her blood to spill and produce three giant scorpions. Calibos and the scorpions attack and kill Perseus's remaining escorts. Alone, Perseus overcomes the scorpions and kills Calibos.

Weakened by his struggle, he sends Bubo to rescue Pegasus from Calibos' henchmen. After reaching the amphitheater in Joppa, Perseus collapses from exhaustion. Andromeda is shackled to the sacrificial rock outside Joppa, and the Kraken is summoned. Bubo distracts the beast until Perseus, whose strength was secretly restored by Zeus, appears on Pegasus. Using Medusa's head, Perseus petrifies the Kraken, causing it to crumble to pieces. He then tosses the head into the sea, frees Andromeda, and marries her.

The gods predict that Perseus and Andromeda will live happily, rule wisely, and produce children, and Zeus forbids the other gods to pursue vengeance against them. The constellations of Perseus, Andromeda, Pegasus and Cassiopeia are created in their honor.

Cast
 Harry Hamlin as Perseus
 Judi Bowker as Andromeda
 Burgess Meredith as Ammon
 Maggie Smith as Thetis
 Siân Phillips as Cassiopeia
 Claire Bloom as Hera
 Ursula Andress as Aphrodite
 Laurence Olivier as Zeus
 Pat Roach as Hephaestus
 Susan Fleetwood as Athena
 Tim Pigott-Smith as Thallo
 Jack Gwillim as Poseidon
 Neil McCarthy as Calibos
 Vida Taylor as Danaë
 Donald Houston as Acrisius
 Flora Robson, Anna Manahan and Freda Jackson as the Stygian Witches

Production
The film was the idea of writer Beverley Cross. In 1978, Andor Films submitted a copy of the script to the British Board of Film Classification, seeking advice on how to secure either a "U" or an "A" certificate. The draft script included scenes that the BBFC considered would be unacceptable under those certificates, including the Kraken tearing Pegasus to pieces and Andromeda appearing naked during the climax of the film. Changes to the script and, on submission, some cuts to Perseus's final battle with Calibos were made and the film secured the "A" certificate: "Those aged 5 and older admitted, but not recommended for children under 14 years of age".

Ray Harryhausen used stop-motion animation to create the various creatures in the film, including Calibos, his vulture, Pegasus, Bubo the mechanical owl, Dioskilos, Medusa, the scorpions and the Kraken. Harryhausen was also co-producer of the film, and retired from film-making shortly after it was released. Despite Bubo's similarities to the droid R2-D2 of the 1977 film Star Wars, Harryhausen claimed Bubo was created before Star Wars was released. The BBFC, reviewing the film for certification in 1981, said Harryhausen's effects were well done and would give entertainment to audiences of all ages, but might appear a little "old hat" to those familiar with Star Wars and Superman.

Columbia Pictures were initially set to distribute the film having made most of Harryhausen and producer Charles H. Schneer's films, but after a change of guard at the studio, they dropped the project during pre-production, saying it was too expensive. Schneer took it to Orion Pictures who insisted on Arnold Schwarzenegger playing the lead but the producer refused as the role involved too much dialogue. He then tried Metro-Goldwyn-Mayer who agreed to finance. "They loved the material, they loved the picture, and they were wonderful to us," said Schneer. "As I put the film together and the castings came up, they approved the additional castings and added that expense to the budget."

Schneer deliberately sought better known actors to play the Gods to improve the film's chances at the box office. "If we had played this picture with no recognised actors it might be assumed to be what it isn't. It might suffer the fate of an Italian Western." The scenes involving the Gods only took eight days. Claire Bloom said she only agreed to make it "because I was told Olivier was doing it and it only lasts a week."

MGM overruled Schneer's choice of John Gielgud to portray the playwright Ammon, and asked for Burgess Meredith to be cast instead. "I saw the sense in that," said Schneer. "They preferred an American actor. They didn't want the public to think it was totally an English picture."

Schneer picked Desmond Davis to direct in part because Davis had made several BBC Shakespeare films and he wanted someone with experience dealing with Shakespearean actors.

Malcolm McDowell, Michael York and Richard Chamberlain were considered for Perseus before Hamlin was cast. 

Stars Harry Hamlin and Ursula Andress were romantically involved at the time of production. Their son, Dimitri, was born in 1980 after filming was completed, and their relationship ended in 1983.

Jack Gwillim, who appeared as Poseidon, had earlier played the role of King Aeëtes in the original Jason and the Argonauts in 1963.

The film's screenwriter, Beverley Cross, was married to Maggie Smith, who played Thetis, until his death in 1998. Cross worked with producer Charles H. Schneer before, writing the screenplay for Schneer's production of Jason and the Argonauts.

Locations

Other locations include:
 Cornwall, United Kingdom.
 The Albert R. Broccoli 007 Stage, at Pinewood Studios, United Kingdom.
 Paestum, Italy

Reception

Box office
Clash of the Titans was released on June 12, 1981 and grossed $6,565,347 from 1,127 theaters in its opening weekend, second behind Raiders of the Lost Ark at the U.S. box office, which was released on the same date. By the time it finished its theatrical run, it had grossed $41 million in North America. The film had a worldwide gross of over $70 million and was one of 1981's biggest hits.

Critical reception
On review aggregator website Rotten Tomatoes, the film holds an approval rating of 63% based on 49 reviews, and an average rating of 6/10. The website's critical consensus reads, "A goofy, old-school sword-and-sandal epic, Clash of the Titans mines Greek mythology for its story and fleshes it out with Ray Harryhausen's charmingly archaic stop-motion animation techniques."

Roger Ebert of the Chicago Sun-Times gave the film three and a half out of four stars and called it "a grand and glorious romantic adventure, filled with brave heroes, beautiful heroines, fearsome monsters, and awe-inspiring duels to the death. It is a lot of fun." Gene Siskel of the Chicago Tribune also gave the film three and a half stars out of four and called it "a special effects spectacular that succeeds brilliantly as an old-fashioned adventure film based on the legends of Greek mythology." Variety called it "an unbearable bore of a film that will probably put to sleep the few adults stuck taking the kids to it. This mythical tale of Perseus, son of Zeus, and his quest for the 'fair' Andromeda, is mired in a slew of corny dialog and an endless array of flat, outdated special effects that are both a throwback to a bad 1950's picture." Vincent Canby of The New York Times wrote, "Though not very witty, the adventures are many and involve a lot of Mr. Harryhausen's specialities," though he thought the monsters were "less convincing than interesting." Kevin Thomas of the Los Angeles Times stated that the film "has charm, it has imagination, but it is also too often stodgy. It is an instance of the whole not being nearly as good as its parts. However, Harryhausen's contributions do delight, and this may be more than enough for his ardent admirers and most youngsters." Gary Arnold of The Washington Post wrote that Hamlin was "always a magnetic presence" but the film's appeal was "quaint and stilted." Geoff Brown of The Monthly Film Bulletin wrote that the film "unfortunately fails to shake much dust off the genre ... Despite the producers' protracted labours, there's a real possibility that some audiences will be turned to stone before Medusa shows up." Time stated "The real titan is Ray Harryhausen."

Christopher John reviewed Clash of the Titans in Ares Magazine #9 and commented that "Clash of the Titans is still one of Harryhausen's best works. It has a decent script, a fine cast, and a lot of good effects. The problem lies in the little things. If, in truth, it was to be a clash of the titans, then that is who should have been featured; it should have been either the gods' or Perseus' story, not both. The film falls between two schools... and even Harryhausen can't save it no matter how excellent his magic."

In a book published in 2000, Stephen R. Wilk suggested that "most people today who are aware of the story of Perseus and Medusa owe their knowledge to" the film.

Legacy
The four-issue comic book miniseries Wrath of the Titans (2007), released by TidalWave Productions as part of their Ray Harryhausen Signature Series, picked up the story 5 years after the events of the film.

Harry Hamlin reprised his role as Perseus for the video game, God of War II (2007).

The 3D remake Clash of the Titans (2010) and its sequel Wrath of the Titans (2012) were released by the property's current rights holder Warner Bros. (through Turner Entertainment Co., WB's sister company) The Kraken would appear in The Lego Batman Movie as one of the villains rallied by the Joker to destroy Gotham City. Bubo made an appearance in "The Trouble With Truth", an episode of the animated series Justice League Action.

See also
 List of stop motion films
 List of historical drama films
 Greek mythology in popular culture

References

External links

 
 
 
 
 
 
 

1981 films
1980s fantasy adventure films
1980s monster movies
British fantasy adventure films
British monster movies
American fantasy adventure films
American monster movies
American epic fantasy films
Giant monster films
Films based on classical mythology
Films directed by Desmond Davis
Films set in classical antiquity
Films set in ancient Greece
Films shot at Pinewood Studios
Films using stop-motion animation
Metro-Goldwyn-Mayer films
United Artists films
Films about witchcraft
Greek and Roman deities in fiction
Kraken in popular culture
Pegasus in popular culture
Cultural depictions of Medusa
Films scored by Laurence Rosenthal
Films shot in Spain
Clash of the Titans (film series)
Films produced by Ray Harryhausen
Films produced by Charles H. Schneer
Films with screenplays by Beverley Cross
American sword and sorcery films
1980s English-language films
1980s American films
1980s British films
Films set in Greece
American epic films